The Sample Formation is a geologic formation in Indiana.

References

 Generalized Stratigraphic Column of Indiana Bedrock

Geology of Indiana